Behdad Salimi Kordasiabi (born 8 December 1989) is former Iranian heavyweight weightlifter. He won gold medals at the 2012 Olympics, 2010–2018 Asian Games, 2010 and 2011 World Championships and 2009–2012 Asian Championships. He served as the flag bearer for Iran at the opening ceremony of the 2014 Asian Games.

Career

At the 2010 World Weightlifting Championships Salimi won the gold medal in the +105kg category. Salimi won gold again in the +105kg category at the 2010 Asian Games with a 205kg snatch and a 235kg clean and jerk.

Salimi won the gold medal at the 2011 World Weightlifting Championships in Paris, France on 13 November 2011, and set a new snatch world record of 214kg.

Salimi became the 2012 Olympic gold medalist in the +105kg category on 7 August 2012 with a 208kg snatch and a 247kg clean and jerk for a total of 455kg.

Despite a torn ACL, total knee re-construction and over two years out of the game, Behdad Salimi returned to weightlifting in 2016 to compete in the Fajr Cup, held in Tehran, Iran and won gold.

At the Rio 2016 Olympics, he broke the world record snatch set moments before by Lasha Talakhadze, making 216kg, in the clean and jerk he initially completed a lift of 245kg which was approved by 2 of the three judges before being disqualified by the 5 member jury. Iran’s National Olympics Committee filed an application to the CAS. The International Weightlifting Federation website was hacked the next morning and its Instagram page flooded with over 285,000 comments.

Leaving National Team
After 2012 London Olympic games he and other Olympic medalists of Iran protested against Iran's national weightlifting team head coach Kourosh Bagheri for using offensive language in training and declined to attend national team exercises. As a result of a heavy argument on a live TV debate between Salimi and Kourosh Bagheri, the Iranian Weightlifting Federation dismissed Salimi and other weightlifters, and did not invite any of the London medalists for the 2013 Asian Weightlifting Championships and 2013 World Weightlifting Championships.

Retirement
After winning his third gold medal at the 2018 Asian Games, with a total of 461kg, Salimi announced his retirement from the sport.

Major results

See also
 Hossein Rezazadeh

References

External links

 
 
 
 

1989 births
Living people
Iranian male weightlifters
Iranian strength athletes
World Weightlifting Championships medalists
Asian Games gold medalists for Iran
Olympic medalists in weightlifting
Olympic gold medalists for Iran
Olympic weightlifters of Iran
Weightlifters at the 2012 Summer Olympics
Weightlifters at the 2016 Summer Olympics
Medalists at the 2012 Summer Olympics
World record holders in Olympic weightlifting
Asian Games medalists in weightlifting
Weightlifters at the 2010 Asian Games
Weightlifters at the 2014 Asian Games
Weightlifters at the 2018 Asian Games
Melli Haffari club sportspeople
Zob Ahan Esfahan F.C. sportspeople
Persepolis club sportspeople
Medalists at the 2010 Asian Games
Medalists at the 2014 Asian Games
Medalists at the 2018 Asian Games
People from Qaem Shahr
Sportspeople from Mazandaran province
21st-century Iranian people